Dr. Ado Jimada Gana Muhammad (OON) (was born on January 18, 1967)  is the Global Programme  Director at the D-8 Health and Social Protection Programme and was once the Executive Director/CEO of the Nigeria' s National Primary Health Care Development Agency (NPHCDA), the government organ responsible  for developing national primary health care (PHC) policy and supporting states and Local Government Areas (LGAs) to implement them.

Dr. Muhammad was appointed to that position on November 1, 2011, by the administration of President Goodluck Jonathan. Prior to his appointment,  Dr Ado served as a Special Assistant to the permanent secretary, Dr Daudu, in the State House, Abuja.

Governor Mu'azu Babangida Aliyu of Niger State, where Dr. Muhammad hails from, commended President Goodluck Jonathan for appointing the medical doctor, describing the action as putting "a square peg in a square hole".
 Dr Ado succeeded Dr.  Muhammad Ali Pate who was in 2011 appointed as the Minister of State for Health, thereby creating a vacuum at the NPHCDA.

His Mandate at NPHCDA 
Dr. Muhammad worked to achieve seven major objectives at the NPHCDA. The objectives were: To control preventable diseases; Improve access to basic health services; Improve quality of care; Strengthen institutions in the healthcare system; Develop a high-performing and empowered health workforce across the country. Other goals are to strengthen  partnerships and engage with communities regularly to get feedback.

Awards  
In recognition of his outstanding achievements at the NPHCDA, Nigeria's President Goodluck Jonathan honoured Dr. Muhammad with the National Award of the Officer of the Order of the Niger (OON) on September 29, 2014. The award of OON, which is one of the country's highest national honours, was conferred on him by the president in appreciation of his outstanding efforts to drive the process of providing primary healthcare to Nigeria's poor and most vulnerable citizens. Speaking shortly before he conferred the wards on Dr. Muhammad and other citizens, the president described the 2014 award recipients as "sincere men and women who point society in the right direction and mirror the possibilities of greatness unlimited."
In 2013, Dr. Muhammad emerged as winner of the Public Administrator of the Year Award, PAYA, which is organized annually by the Centre for Policy Development and Political Studies, Lagos, Nigeria.
The centre said after announcing the winner that of the 10 nominees for the award, Muhammad scored 3,025 votes, which made up over 50 percent of the total votes cast. The NPHCDA CEO was praised for his efforts in "eradication of poliomyelitis; reduction in maternal and infant mortality; impressive initiatives in addressing human resource challenges in the primary health care, PHC, sub-sector; integration and decentralization of HIV/AIDs intervention in PHC services in over 1,500 PHC facilities;"

The NPHCDA boss also won the Kwame Nkrumah Leadership Award and Africa Leadership ICON 2014. He was unanimously endorsed winner of the leadership award for the year, at the 71st Conference of AASU, held at OATTU Conference Centre, in Accra, Ghana
The Kwame Nkrumah Leadership Award and Africa Leadership ICON 2014 is awarded by All-Africa Students’ Union (AASU). The Union is made up of 54 member unions from Francophone and Anglophone countries in Africa. The body noted that the NPHCDA boss emerged winner 
"due to his unprecedented progress in polio eradication in Nigeria and repositioning of Primary Health Centres as the cornerstone of our health system,".

Previous appointments 
Dr. Muhammad previously worked as Senior Technical Adviser (Health Sector), in the Office of the Senior Assistant to the Nigerian President on Millennium Development Goals. Prior to that role, he was National Health Adviser for the Bamako Initiative Programme which was part of the now defunct Petroleum Trust Fund. 
He had also worked with the National Programme on Immunization (NPI), prior to its merger with the NPHCDA.

Education 
Muhammad graduated from the School of Medicine, University of Ilorin in Nigeria. He was admitted to the school in 1992. He also studied at the University of Wales, United Kingdom where he obtained a master's degree in public health (1996) and the University of Nottingham where he obtained a master's degree in Public Administration .

Family 
Dr. Muhammad is happily married with children.

References

Nigerian public health doctors
1967 births
Living people
University of Ilorin alumni
Alumni of the University of Wales